Patricia Jane Moberly (née Coney; 20 October 1938 – 2 September 2016) was a British public servant, Labour politician, activist, and teacher. She is best known for her work as Chair of Guy's and St Thomas' NHS Foundation Trust between 1999 and 2011.

Moberly was born in Fareham, Hampshire. Her father was in the Royal Navy meaning that the family moved around a lot. She was educated at seven schools, including a boarding school during her teenage years. Despite the disapproval of her father, she studied English at the University of Liverpool. She would later return to her studies, attending King's College London, and completed a doctorate in 1985.

Moberly married in 1959. Her husband was an Anglican priest and she followed him to Northern Rhodesia when he was posted to a parish there. During her time in the country, that would soon become the independent Zambia, she taught at local schools and became involved in anti-racist politics. She became one of the few white women to join the United National Independence Party.

The family moved back to England in 1967 when Moberly's husband became vicar of a church in the Diocese of Southwark. She continued her career in teaching, working at three different schools over a more than thirty-year period. Her last position before retirement was as Head of Sixth Form at Pimlico School. While teaching, she continued being politically active: she served as a Labour councillor, was active in the Anti-Apartheid Movement, and was even arrested in the 1970s during a protest outside Downing Street.

Moberly was also a prolific public servant. She served on her local Area Health Authority in the 1970s and then on its successor the District Health Authority in the 1980s. She also served as a governor of Maudsley Hospital and Bethlem Royal Hospital in the 1970s, and as a governor of the United Medical and Dental Schools of Guy's and St Thomas' Hospitals (UMDS) in the 1980s. Having retired from teaching, she served as the Chair of Guy's and St Thomas' NHS Foundation Trust between 1999 and 2011. She additionally served as a lay member of the General Medical Council in the 21st century. Her final public appointment, before retiring due to ill health, was as a member of the Committee on Standards in Public Life.

Early life and education
Moberly was born on 20 October 1938 in Fareham, Hampshire, England. She was the youngest child of Gerald Coney, a Royal Navy officer, and Margaret Coney (née Jelf). Due to her father's career, the family moved around a lot: she had moved home 11 times by the age of ten. She was educated a six different schools before being sent to board at Sunny Hill School, a private school. Having received a scholarship, she studied English language and literature at the University of Liverpool: she graduated with a first class honours Bachelor of Arts (BA Hons) degree. One of her lecturers was Kenneth Muir, the eminent Shakespeare scholar. Her father had not wanted her to attend university, stating that she was "fit only to be a cook".

Moberly later undertook postgraduate studies at King's College London, completing her Doctor of Philosophy (PhD) degree in 1985. Her doctoral thesis concerned the work of Charlotte Mary Yonge, a 19th-century novelist with links to the Oxford Movement and the Pre-Raphaelite Brotherhood. In November 2008, she was awarded an honorary Doctor of Science (DSc) degree by the London South Bank University in recognition of her "formidable contribution to health management and medical ethics, but also to education, and throughout her career, to the cause of anti-racism".

Career

Teaching career
After leaving university, the newly married Moberly took on the role of vicar's wife. In 1963, her husband was posted to a church in Chingola, Northern Rhodesia. The following year, Northern Rhodesia became independent of British rule and was renamed Zambia. From 1964 to 1967, she taught at Chikola School, a local secondary school for black Africans.

In 1967, the family returned to England and her husband was appointed Vicar of St Anselm's Church, Kennington, London in the Diocese of Southwark. She taught English at The John Roan School in Greenwich, from 1967 to 1968, and at Mary Datchelor School in Camberwell from 1968 to 1974. She then joined Pimlico School, where she was a senior teacher from 1974 to 1998 and the head of Sixth Form from 1985 to 1998.

Political life
During her time in Zambia, Moberly became opposed to racial oppression and the Apartheid of neighbouring South Africa. She joined the United National Independence Party, becoming one of its few white female members. She also hosted political exiles from South Africa, including Zanele Dlamini Mbeki, future wife of Thabo Mbeki and First Lady of South Africa (1999–2008).

Having returned to England, Moberly joined the Labour Party and was active in the Anti-Apartheid Movement. She was an elected councillor on Lambeth London Borough Council between 1971 and 1978. In the October 1974 General Election, she unsuccessfully stood as the Labour candidate in Marylebone, losing to conservative Kenneth Baker.

In the early 1970, Moberly was arrested after a demonstration outside Downing Street: the protest was against the British government's inaction over the war in Rhodesia. She had been accused of throwing a placard stating "No Peace Without Majority Rule" at a car containing the then prime minister, Ted Heath: she was convicted of a breach of the peace. She was defended by the eminent barrister Dingle Foot. Her conviction was overturned on appeal, due in part because the Morning Star published a photograph of her under arrest but still holding the placard in question.

Public service
Moberly was a member of the Lambeth, Southwark and Lewisham Area Health Authority from 1976 to 1981, and then of the Lambeth District Health Authority from 1981 to 1990. She was a lay member of the General Medical Council in 2002, and in 2003.

Moberly served as a governor of Maudsley Hospital and Bethlem Royal Hospital, two psychiatric hospitals, from 1976 to 1978. She served as a governor of the United Medical and Dental Schools of Guy's and St Thomas' Hospitals (UMDS) from 1988 to 1990. She was a non-executive director of Guy's and St Thomas' NHS Foundation Trust from 1997 until becoming its chairwomen.

From 1999 to 2011, Moberly served as Chair of Guy's and St Thomas' NHS Foundation Trust. This was arguably the post for which she was best known. When she arrived there were clear issues with the trust: racial divisions meant that black nurses mainly worked on less prestigious wards such as elderly care, and consultant appointments were perceived as being affected Freemasonry membership. During her 12 years in charge, and having been "initially met with resistance from the predominantly white medical establishment", she strived for racial and gender diversity throughout trust. She was succeeded in the role by Sir Hugh Taylor, a retired civil servant.

Moberly's final public post was as a member of the Committee on Standards in Public Life, to which she was appointed on 17 May 2012. Due to her cancer diagnosis, she had stepped down from most of her other responsibilities, but also continued as a visitor at Brixton Prison.

Personal life
In 1959, the then 20-year-old Patricia Coney married Richard Hamilton Moberly, an Anglican priest. Together they had four children: two sons and two daughters.

Patricia Moberly died on 2 September 2016, aged 77; she had cancer.

References

1938 births
2016 deaths
Schoolteachers from Hampshire
People from Fareham
People educated at Bruton School for Girls
Alumni of the University of Liverpool
Councillors in the London Borough of Lambeth
Labour Party (UK) councillors
Labour Party (UK) parliamentary candidates
Alumni of King's College London
United National Independence Party members
Deaths from cancer in the United Kingdom
Women councillors in England